Rosanna Li Wei Han is a Hong Kong artist and sculptor.

She is an associate professor at the Hong Kong Polytechnic University and an honorary consultant of the Hong Kong Museum of Art and Hong Kong Heritage Museum.

Works
Rosanna Li Wei Han is known for her "signature ceramic fat ladies" sculptures. Her most famous work is a permanent public sculpture in Yau Tong station, titled People Passing By, People Lazing By.  Her work is currently being temporarily exhibited at the Hong Kong University of Science and Technology Library in Spring 2018.

Qualification 
 MA in Educational Management, Cheltenham & Gloucester College, UK
 Post-graduate Diploma in Art Education, University of London, UK
 B.Ed (Hons) University of Liverpool, UK (Education & Ceramics)
 Higher Certificate in Studio Ceramics, Hong Kong Polytechnic
 Specialist Certificate in the Teaching of Art, Grantham College of Education, HK
 Teacher Certificate, Northcote College of Education

References

External links 

 Li Wei Han, Rosanna on the HKU Hong Kong Art Archive
 INTERVIEW: Ceramic Artist Rosanna Li Concept of HK Teahouse - Blouinartinfo Hong Kong

Living people
Hong Kong sculptors
Academic staff of Hong Kong Polytechnic University
Hong Kong women artists
Hong Kong artists
Year of birth missing (living people)